Bingaman Lake is a lake in Tuolumne County, California, in the United States.

Bingaman Lake was named for John W. Bingaman, a park ranger who stocked the lake with fish in exchange for the naming rights. The lake is below Kuna Crest and Kuna Peak.

See also
List of lakes in California

References

Lakes of Tuolumne County, California
Lakes of Yosemite National Park